Pimp My Barrow was a charity event established in 2006 which ran every year until 2019 at the University of East Anglia in Norwich, UK. Several other successful events have also taken place in Suffolk and Cambridge. 

Students acquire a wheelbarrow and decorate it in accordance with their team's theme. The day commences with drinking and music in the UEA square. Barrows are then paraded around the local area, via a selection of local pubs and with a wheelbarrow race through Eaton Park. 

The event was founded by Paul Wheeler and Thomas Tapper who retain ownership and copyright of the event.

In March 2012 the founders of Pimp My Barrow offered the rights to manage the Norwich event to the Union of UEA Students at the University of East Anglia. This agreement required the University to uphold the ethos of previous events and continue to operate for a charitable cause.

On 17 June 2016 "Pimp My Barrow" was successfully trademarked by Paul Wheeler and Thomas Tapper. The rights to use the trademark in the Norwich area are licensed to the Union of UEA Students for a fixed term.

The Norwich event was suspended in 2019 for unspecified safety reasons.

Sources 
 
 

University of East Anglia